is a Japanese mixed martial artist, currently competing in the strawweight division of Pancrase, where he is the former Strawweight King of Pancrase.

As of January 3, 2022, he is ranked as the second best strawweight in the world by Fight Matrix. Fight Matrix furthermore ranks him as the tenth best strawweight in the history of the sport.

Mixed martial arts career

Flyweight career
Kitakata made his professional debut against Yuya Ono at Pancrase - Passion Tour 2 on March 22, 2010. He won the fight by a first-round guillotine choke. During the rest of the year, Kitakata notched a technical knockout victory against Hiroyuki Nakajima and a unanimous decision loss to Hiroyuki Nakajima. Kitakata was then scheduled to participate in the 2011 Pancrase Neo Blood tournament, and faced Yuki Uejima in the quarterfinals, at Pancrase - Impressive Tour 2 on March 13, 2011. He won the fight by a third-round technical knockout. He advanced to the semifinals, held at Pancrase - Impressive Tour 5 on June 5, 2011, where he faced Yuki Yasunaga. Yasunaga won the fight by unanimous decision. Kitakata fought Shohei Takamatsu at Pancrase - Impressive Tour 12 on November 27, 2011, in his final fight of the year. He won the bout by majority decision.

Kitakata faced Yuki Nishigo at Pancrase - Progress Tour 2 on March 3, 2012. He lost the fight by majority decision. Kitakata was scheduled to face Isao Hirose at Pancrase Progress Tour 5 on April 28, 2012. He won the fight by majority decision. Kitakita next faced the debuting Yusuke Ogikubo at Pancrase Progress Tour 9 on August 5, 2012. He won the fight by a second-round technical knockout. Kitakata faced Seiji Ozuka at Pancrase Progress Tour 13 on November 25, 2012, in his fifth and final fight of the year. He won the fight by majority decision. It was the first time in his professional career that he had strung together three consecutive victories.

Kitakata faced Atsushi Yamamoto at Pancrase 246 on March 17, 2013. He lost the fight by unanimous decision. Kitakata faced Yasutaka Koga at Pancrase 249 on July 14, 2013. He lost the fight by a first-round knockout. Kitakata was scheduled to face Tatsuya So at Pancrase 253 at on November 3, 2013. He fight was ruled a unanimous decision draw.

Kitakata's winless streak extended to four consecutive fights after he lost to Yuki Yasunaga by split decision at Pancrase 258 on May 11, 2014. Kitakata snapped his winless streak at Pancrase Osaka on July 20, 2014, after beating Kohei Haruka by unanimous decision. He followed this up with a second-round submission of Kanta Sato at DEEP Cage Impact 2014 in Osaka on October 19, 2014. He finished the year with a split decision loss to Hiroyuki Abe at Pancrase Osaka on December 21, 2014.

Kitakata faced the undefeated Raymison Bruno at Pancrase 268 on July 5, 2015. The fight was ruled a no-contest after just 49 seconds, as Kitakata was unable to continue fighting due to a low blow. Kitakata was next scheduled to face Takafumi Ato at Pancrase 270 on October 4, 2015. Although Kitakata won the fight by a third-round stoppage, the fight result was overturned to a no-contest as he missed weight prior to the bout.

Move to strawweight
Following the second no-contest, Kitakta moved down to strawweight. After notching three straight victories against Tetsuo Nakanishi, Shinya Murofushi and Suguru Hayasaka, Kitakata challenged the reigning Strawweight King of Pancrase Mitsuhisa Sunabe at Pancrase 283 on December 18, 2016. Sunabe won the fight by a second-round submission.

Kitakata faced Ryo Hatta at Pancrase 286 on April 23, 2017. He won the fight by a third-round guillotine choke. Kitakata faced Hiroaki Ijima at Pancrase 296 on May 20, 2018. He won the fight by a second-round submission. Kitakata faced Tatsuya So at Pancrase 304 on April 14, 2019. He won the fight by unanimous decision.

Pancrase strawweight champion
Kitakata challenged the incumbent Strawweight King of Pancrase Mitsuhisa Sunabe for the second time at Pancrase 307 on July 21, 2019. The two of the previously fought at Pancrase 283 on December 18, 2016, with Sunabe winning by a second-round rear-naked choke. Kitakata was more successful in the rematch, as he won the fight by a fifth-round technical knockout.

Kitakata faced the reigning Shooto flyweight champion Yosuke Saruta at ONE Championship: Century Part Two on October 13, 2019. The bout was contested at 57kg, which was Kitakata's first flyweight appearance since October 4, 2015. Saruta won the fight by a second-round technical knockout, stopping Kitakata with ground and pound at the 0:59 minute mark.

Kitakata was expected to make his first Pancrase strawweight title defense against Adam Antolin at Pancrase 313 on March 8, 2020. On February 10, 2020, it was announced by the promotion that Kitakata had withdrawn from the fight, as he had broken his hand in training.

Kitakata faced the former ZST flyweight champion Tatsuki Saomoto at Rizin 25 – Osaka on November 21, 2020, in his second consecutive flyweight bout. Saomoto outworked Kitakata over the three rounds and won the fight by unanimous decision.

Kitakata was sidelined for the majority of 2021, as he was diagnosed with an ossification of the posterior longitudinal ligament in April. He was furthermore diagnosed with a cervical herniated disc, at discs #5 and #6. He began treatment and rehabilitation immediately after the diagnosis, and was expected to face Yusaku Nakamura at Rizin 29 – Osaka on June 27, 2021. He was forced to withdraw from the bout however, as the doctor didn't clear him to fight during the pre-fight medical check-up. 

Three months later, on September 29, 2021, it was announced that Kitakata would make his first title defense against the #1 ranked Pancrase strawweight contender Yuta Miyazawa. Kitakata's first title defense was scheduled for Pancrase 325 on December 11, 2021, two years and five months after he had won the belt. He won the fight by a third-round technical knockout. Kitakata dropped Miyazawa with a left hook, which he followed up with ground and pound which forced referee Kosuke Umeda to wave the fight off.

Kitakata returned to flyweight to face Yutaro Muramoto, at Rizin 34 on March 20, 2022. He won the fight by unanimous decision.

Kitakata was booked to make his second Pancrase title defense against the undefeated Keito Yamakita at Pancrse 328 on July 18, 2022. He lost the title by unanimous decision.

Mixed martial arts record

|-
| Loss
| align=center| 20-11-1 (2)
| Keito Yamakita
| Decision (unanimous)
| Pancrase 328
| 
| align=center| 5
| align=center| 5:00
| Tokyo, Japan
| 
|-
| Win
| align=center| 20-10-1 (2)
| Yutaro Muramoto
| Decision (unanimous)
| Rizin 34
| 
| align=center| 3
| align=center| 5:00
| Osaka, Japan
| 
|-
| Win
| align=center| 19-10-1 (2)
| Yuta Miyazawa
| KO (punches)
| Pancrase - 325
| 
| align=center| 3
| align=center| 2:28
| Tokyo, Japan
| 
|-
| Loss
| align=center| 18-10-1 (2)
| Tatsuki Saomoto
| Decision (unanimous)
| Rizin 25
| 
| align=center| 3
| align=center| 5:00
| Osaka, Japan
| 
|-
| Loss
| align=center| 18-9-1 (2)
| Yosuke Saruta
| KO (punches)
| ONE Championship: Century Part Two
| 
| align=center| 2
| align=center| 0:59
| Tokyo, Japan
| 
|-
| Win
| align=center| 18-8-1 (2)
| Mitsuhisa Sunabe
| TKO (punches)
| Pancrase - 307
| 
| align=center| 5
| align=center| 0:38
| Tokyo, Japan
| 
|-
| Win
| align=center| 17-8-1 (2)
| Tatsuya So
| Decision (unanimous)
| Pancrase - 304
| 
| align=center| 3
| align=center| 5:00
| Tokyo, Japan
| 
|-
| Win
| align=center| 16-8-1 (2)
| Hiroaki Ijima
| Submission (guillotine choke)
| Pancrase - 296
| 
| align=center| 2
| align=center| 0:46
| Tokyo, Japan
| 
|-
| Win
| align=center| 15-8-1 (2)
| Daniel Lima de Carvalho
| Decision (unanimous)
| Pancrase - 290
| 
| align=center| 3
| align=center| 5:00
| Tokyo, Japan
| 
|-
| Win
| align=center| 14-8-1 (2)
| Ryo Hatta
| Submission (guillotine choke)
| Pancrase - 286
| 
| align=center| 3
| align=center| 4:47
| Tokyo, Japan
| 
|-
| Loss
| align=center| 13-8-1 (2)
| Mitsuhisa Sunabe
| Submission (rear-naked choke)
| Pancrase - 283
| 
| align=center| 2
| align=center| 0:48
| Tokyo, Japan
| 
|-
| Win
| align=center| 13-7-1 (2)
| Suguru Hayasaka
| TKO (punches)
| Pancrase - Osaka
| 
| align=center| 3
| align=center| 4:05
| Osaka, Japan
| 
|-
| Win
| align=center| 12-7-1 (2)
| Shinya Murofushi
| Decision (unanimous)
| Pancrase - 276
| 
| align=center| 3
| align=center| 5:00
| Osaka, Japan
| 
|-
| Win
| align=center| 11-7-1 (2)
| Tetsuo Nakanishi
| Decision (unanimous)
| Pancrase - Osaka
| 
| align=center| 3
| align=center| 5:00
| Osaka, Japan
| 
|-
| NC
| align=center| 10-7-1 (2)
| Takafumi Ato
| No Contest (Kitakata missed weight)
| Pancrase - 270
| 
| align=center| 3
| align=center| 1:26
| Tokyo, Japan
| 
|-
| NC
| align=center| 10-7-1 (1)
| Raymison Bruno Souza De Oliveira
| No Contest (Accidental Groin Kick)
| Pancrase - 268
| 
| align=center| 1
| align=center| 0:49
| Tokyo, Japan
| 
|-
| Win
| align=center| 10-7-1 
| Takeshi Sato
| Decision (unanimous)
| Deep - Osaka Impact 2015
| 
| align=center| 2
| align=center| 5:00
| Osaka, Japan
| 
|-
| Loss
| align=center| 9-7-1 
| Hiroyuki Abe
| Decision (split)
| Pancrase - Osaka
| 
| align=center| 3
| align=center| 5:00
| Osaka, Japan
| 
|-
| Win
| align=center| 9-6-1 
| Kanta Sato
| Submission (rear-naked choke)
| Deep - Cage Impact 2014 in Osaka
| 
| align=center| 2
| align=center| 2:34
| Osaka, Japan
| 
|-
| Win
| align=center| 8-6-1 
| Kohei Hamamoto
| Decision (unanimous)
| Pancrase - Osaka
| 
| align=center| 3
| align=center| 3:00
| Osaka, Japan
| 
|-
| Loss
| align=center| 7-6-1 
| Yuki Yasunaga
| Decision (split)
| Pancrase - 258
| 
| align=center| 3
| align=center| 3:00
| Tokyo, Japan
| 
|-
| Draw
| align=center| 7-5-1 
| Tatsuya So
| Draw (unanimous)
| Pancrase - 253
| 
| align=center| 3
| align=center| 5:00
| Tokyo, Japan
| 
|-
| Loss
| align=center| 7-5
| Yasutaka Koga
| KO (punch)
| Pancrase - 249
| 
| align=center| 1
| align=center| 4:36
| Tokyo, Japan
| 
|-
| Loss
| align=center| 7-4
| Atsushi Yamamoto
| Decision (unanimous)
| Pancrase - 246
| 
| align=center| 3
| align=center| 5:00
| Tokyo, Japan
| 
|-
| Win
| align=center| 7-3
| Seiji Ozuka
| Decision (majority)
| Pancrase - Progress Tour 13
| 
| align=center| 3
| align=center| 5:00
| Tokyo, Japan
| 
|-
| Win
| align=center| 6-3
| Yusuke Ogikubo
| TKO (punches)
| Pancrase - Progress Tour 9
| 
| align=center| 2
| align=center| 3:26
| Tokyo, Japan
| 
|-
| Win
| align=center| 5-3
| Isao Hirose
| Decision (majority)
| Pancrase - Progress Tour 5
| 
| align=center| 2
| align=center| 5:00
| Tokyo, Japan
| 
|-
| Loss
| align=center| 4-3
| Yuki Nishigo
| Decision (majority)
| Pancrase - Progress Tour 2
| 
| align=center| 2
| align=center| 5:00
| Tokyo, Japan
| 
|-
| Win
| align=center| 4-2
| Shohei Takamatsu
| Decision (majority)
| Pancrase - Impressive Tour 12
| 
| align=center| 2
| align=center| 5:00
| Osaka, Japan
| 
|-
| Loss
| align=center| 3-2
| Yuki Yasunaga
| Decision (unanimous)
| Pancrase - Impressive Tour 5
| 
| align=center| 2
| align=center| 5:00
| Tokyo, Japan
| 
|-
| Win
| align=center| 3-1
| Yuki Uejima
| TKO (punches)
| Pancrase - Impressive Tour 2
| 
| align=center| 2
| align=center| 3:16
| Osaka, Japan
| 
|-
| Win
| align=center| 2-1
| Shinobu Aoyama
| TKO (punches)
| Pancrase - Passion Tour 12
| 
| align=center| 1
| align=center| 4:05
| Osaka, Japan
| 
|-
| Loss
| align=center| 1-1
| Hiroyuki Nakajima
| Decision (unanimous)
| Pancrase - Passion Tour 5
| 
| align=center| 2
| align=center| 5:00
| Tokyo, Japan
| 
|-
| Win
| align=center| 1-0
| Yuya Ono
| Submission (guillotine choke)
| Pancrase - Passion Tour 2
| 
| align=center| 1
| align=center| 0:45
| Osaka, Japan
| 
|-

See also
 List of Shooto champions
 List of male mixed martial artists

References

Living people
Japanese male mixed martial artists
Strawweight mixed martial artists
Flyweight mixed martial artists
1991 births
Mixed martial artists utilizing judo
Japanese male judoka
Sportspeople from Osaka